Bactra blepharopis is a species of moth of the family Tortricidae. It is found in New Caledonia and Australia, where it has been recorded from New South Wales and Queensland.

The wingspan is about 15 mm. The ground colour of the forewings is brown, speckled with dark brown or grey. The hindwings are pale brown, fading towards the base.

References

Moths described in 1911
Bactrini